Agona West Municipal District is one of the twenty-two districts in Central Region, Ghana.  Originally, it was part of the then-larger Agona District in 1988, until the eastern part of the district was split off to create Agona East District on 29 February 2008; thus the remaining part has been renamed as Agona West District, which was also elevated to municipal district assembly status on that same year to become Agona West Municipal District. The municipality is located in the northeast part of Central Region and has Agona Swedru as its capital town.

List of settlements

Sources
 
 Agona West Municipal – Districts

References

Central Region (Ghana)

Districts of the Central Region (Ghana)